Shandong Tangjun Ouling Automobile Manufacture Co.,Ltd. (traded as Ouling Auto) is a Chinese automobile manufacturing company part of Geely New Energy Commercial Vehicle Group.

In 2012 it was ranked as the 48th manufacturer of motor vehicles by the number of vehicles produced, with 52,708 heavy commercial vehicles and 16,459 light commercial vehicles produced, for a total of 69,167.

References

Truck manufacturers of China